Wings of Power II WWII Fighters is a video game of the flight simulation genre released in 2006 as an add on to enhance Microsoft Flight Simulator 2004 and Flight Simulator X.Wings of Power II adds vintage historical military aircraft to Microsoft's flight simulator series. This simulation add on package is similar to Shockwave Productions earlier Wings of Power: WWII Heavy Bombers and Jets in functionality except that the cockpit graphics and the view controls have been greatly improved.

The aircraft in Wings of Power II: WWII Fighters include the P-51 Mustang model D, Supermarine Spitfire Mk 1B, Republic P-47 D-20 Thunderbolt, Messerschmitt Bf 109 model E-4 and a Mitsubishi A6M5 Zero.

This simulator add on is strictly with Pilot controls only. So there is no combat in this add on. However the developers added some sophisticated controls and actual pilots procedures used to start and fly these aircraft in the simulation. So they simulate how the aircraft is actually flown to an excellent degree. The simulation add on comes with a good size chart detailing the 3D operable controls as used in the actual aircraft. As usual Shockwave Productions recommends that the user obtain the pilots manuals (check the flight manuals external link) for each vintage aircraft for full learning enjoyment.
An individual using this simulation would greatly benefit by obtaining a device known as Track IR. See Battle of Britain II: Wings of Victory for the external links and video demonstration.

See also
 Microsoft Flight Simulator
 Microsoft Flight Simulator X
 History of Microsoft Flight Simulator
 Aircraft Powerpack
 Wings of Power: WWII Heavy Bombers and Jets

External links
Shockwave Productions,Inc.  Website
Shockwave Forum and update patches
Microsoft Games for Windows

The United States Army Air Forces in WWII
Official website of the United States Air Force

2006 video games
Video games developed in the United States
World War II flight simulation video games
Windows games
Windows-only games